Shaver means a person who shaves, or an object which shaves, a razor.
It may also refer to:

Places
United States
 Shaver, California, a former town
 Shaver Creek (Missouri), a tributary of Muddy Creek
 Shaver Creek (Pennsylvania), a tributary of the Juniata River
 Shaver Lake, in Fresno County, California

Other uses
 Electric razor
 Shaver (surname)
 Shaver Transportation Company, an American business founded in 1880